The Inter Baku 2009–10 season was Inter Baku's ninth Azerbaijan Premier League season, and their first season under manager Kakhaber Tskhadadze. Inter finished as Champions of the Azerbaijan Premier League, earning themselves entry into the 2010–11 UEFA Champions League at the Second qualifying round stage. They also participated in the 2009–Azerbaijan Cup, getting knocked out in the Semi-Final stage by eventual winners FK Baku, and the UEFA Europa League where they were beaten in the first qualifying round by Spartak Trnava of Slovakia 5-2 on aggregate.

Squad

Out on loan

Transfers

Summer

In:

 

Out:

Winter

In:

Out:

Competitions

Azerbaijan Premier League

Results

League table

Azerbaijan Premier League Championship Group

Results

Table

Azerbaijan Cup

UEFA Europa League

First qualifying round

Notes
Note 1: Played in Baku at Tofik Bakhramov Stadium as Inter Baku's Shafa Stadium did not meet UEFA criteria.

Squad statistics

Appearances and goals

|-
|colspan="14"|Players who left Baku on loan during the season:

|-
|colspan="14"|Players who appeared for Baku who left during the season:

|}

Goal scorers

Disciplinary record

References
http://www.weltfussball.at/teams/inter-baku/2010/2/
Qarabağ have played their home games at the Tofiq Bahramov Stadium since 1993 due to the ongoing situation in Quzanlı.

External links 
 Inter Baku at Soccerway.com

Shamakhi FK seasons
Inter Baku